Roberto Donadoni  (born 9 September 1963) is an Italian football manager and former midfielder.

Donadoni was capable of playing on either flank, or in the centre. He began his career with Atalanta, and he later became a pillar of the powerhouse AC Milan team of the late 1980s and early 1990s, achieving domestic and international success during his time with the club. In his later career, he was also one of the pioneers of Major League Soccer, where he played two seasons for the NY/NJ MetroStars, before ending his career with Saudi Premier League side Ittihad in 2000.

At international level, Donadoni was also an important member of the Italy national team throughout the late 1980s and early 1990s. He represented his country at the 1988 and 1996 European Championships, and at the 1990 and 1994 FIFA World Cups. With Italy, he reached the semi-finals of Euro 1988, and won bronze and silver medals at the 1990 and 1994 World Cups respectively.

Following his playing career, Donadoni began a career as a manager in 2001, which included spells with Italian clubs Lecco, Livorno and Genoa. He was later appointed head coach of the Italy national team, succeeding Marcello Lippi, who resigned after having won the 2006 World Cup. At Euro 2008, with Donadoni as coach, Italy reached the quarter-finals of the tournament, losing to eventual champions Spain on penalties. On 26 June 2008, Donadoni was dismissed despite having signed a contract extension prior to the beginning of Euro 2008, using a clause in the contract which allowed termination if Italy did not reach the semi-final. He was replaced by Lippi, who returned as national team manager. Following his position as Italy head coach, Donadoni managed Napoli, Cagliari and Parma, until the latter club's bankruptcy in 2015. He then joined Bologna the following season.

Club career

Atalanta and AC Milan
Donadoni started his career with Atalanta in 1982, winning the Serie C1 title, and the Serie B title in 1984. He joined AC Milan in 1986 and he became a mainstay in the legendary team that dominated Italy and Europe in the late 1980s and early-to-mid-1990s. Usually playing a right-sided wide midfield role, Donadoni was a vital part of Milan's squad under both Arrigo Sacchi and Fabio Capello, winning six Serie A titles, three European Cups, four Supercoppa Italiana, three European Super Cups, and two Intercontinental Cups during his time at Milan. Although Donadoni failed to win the Coppa Italia with Milan, he reached the final twice, during the 1989–90 and 1997–98 seasons.

Donadoni was knocked unconscious and suffered a broken jaw after a violent tackle from Goran Vasilijević in the 1988–89 European Cup campaign in a match against Red Star Belgrade. He required treatment on the pitch to stop him choking and was rushed to hospital, where he regained consciousness soon after. On 19 April 1989, he scored a goal in a 5-0 win over Real Madrid CF in the 1989 European Cup semi-finals. In the final of the European Cup, he assisted Gullit's goal in a 4-0 win over Steaua București.

He provided the assist for Daniele Massaro's goal in a 4–0 victory over FC Barcelona in the final of the UEFA Champions League.

MetroStars
After winning his fifth Serie A title with Milan, he went on to play in Major League Soccer (MLS) in the United States. The NY/NJ MetroStars of MLS made him a centerpiece of their franchise when they signed him in 1996. During his first year with the Metros, he was recalled to the Italy national team. He proved a solid performer, being named to the league Best XI in 1996, and was also named an MLS Eastern Conference All-Star, winning the inaugural 1996 MLS All-Star Game 3–2 over the Western Conference MLS All-Stars. Unfortunately, Donadoni's play could not bring the MetroStars any success as a club. In total, Donadoni scored six goals for the MetroStars.

Second spell at Milan and final season with Al-Ittihad
Donadoni briefly rejoined Milan after the 1997 MLS season, helping lead them to another Coppa Italia final in 1998 during Fabio Capello's second spell with the club. He also won another Serie A title under Alberto Zaccheroni in 1999, his sixth and final career Serie A title. In total, Donadoni scored 18 career Serie A goals for Milan in 287 appearances, and 23 in 390 appearances throughout all competitions.

He ended his career by playing for a short time with Al-Ittihad of Saudi Arabia, winning the Saudi Premier League during the 1999–2000 season, and officially retiring from professional football soon after.

International career

Youth career, senior debut, Euro 88, and 1990 World Cup
A member of the Italy under-21 national football team, reaching the final of the 1986 UEFA European Under-21 Championship, Donadoni made his Italy national team senior debut on 8 October 1986, under Azeglio Vicini in a 2–0 victory over Greece. He soon became a key member of his national side, reaching the semi-finals of Euro 1988, and he subsequently played in the 1990 FIFA World Cup, on home soil, helping Italy to a third place finish. Unfortunately, he missed one of the penalties in the fateful semi-final shoot-out against defending champions and eventual runners-up Argentina. Overall, he made five appearances throughout the tournament, missing out on the round of 16 victory against Uruguay due to injury, and the bronze medal match victory against England.

1994 World Cup and Euro 96
Donadoni also took part at the 1994 World Cup, under Arrigo Sacchi, helping Italy to a second-place finish, where Italy would once again be defeated on penalties, by Brazil. However, on this occasion Donadoni did not take a penalty in the final shoot-out. En route to the final, he set up Dino Baggio's goal in Italy's 2–1 quarter-final victory over Spain, and also provided the throw-in on the left flank from which Roberto Baggio scored his first goal in Italy's 2–1 over Bulgaria in the semi-finals of the tournament. He also represented Italy at Euro 1996, which would be his final international tournament prior to his international retirement, appearing in all three group matches. His final appearance for Italy was on 19 June 1996, in the final group match, which ended in a 0–0 draw against the eventual champions Germany, eliminating the Italians in the first round of the tournament. Overall, Donadoni made 63 appearances for Italy, scoring five goals.

Style of play
Regarded as one of Italy's greatest ever wingers, Donadoni was capable of playing anywhere in midfield except for defensive midfield. He could play on either wing, through the centre, or as an attacking midfielder, although he was most frequently deployed on the right flank. He was an important member of his club and national sides throughout his career, standing out for his pace, agility, and technical ability; he often beat players with feints both in one on one situations, or when undertaking individual runs. He was also known for his stamina, which enabled him to function as a box-to-box player. Particularly in his later career he was a midfield playmaker, due to his ability to orchestrate attacking moves for his team. Donadoni delivered assists to teammates in the area from curling crosses and set-pieces. He was also a powerful striker of the ball from distance with either foot, despite being naturally right-footed, and an effective free kick taker. Michel Platini described him as Italy's greatest player of the 1990s. Regarding his playing style, Donadoni once commented "My greatest satisfaction comes from making the pass that leads to the goal."

Managerial career

Early club career: Lecco, Livorno, and Genoa
After retiring as a player, Donadoni trained to become a coach. His first job was as Lecco and he made his debut on 12 August 2001 in the Coppa Italia Lega Pro. This was followed  by jobs with Livorno (2002–03) and Genoa (2003). In 2005, he returned to head Livorno in mid-season. After leading them to a surprising ninth-place finish and having the club in sixth place midway through the 2005–06 season, Donadoni resigned over criticism from club chairman Aldo Spinelli.

International career
In July 2006, following the resignation of Marcello Lippi three days after the Italy national team won the 2006 World Cup, Donadoni was named as new Italian head coach, his first task being to successfully lead Italy through qualification for UEFA Euro 2008.

On 16 August, Donadoni made his Italy head coaching debut in a friendly match against Croatia played at Stadio Armando Picchi, Livorno, which did not feature any of the 23 world champions, save for third goalkeeper Marco Amelia, and ended in a 2–0 defeat. Donadoni took solace in the fact Lippi's first match in charge of the Azzurri was also a friendly defeat, to Iceland.

Path to Euro 2008
Donadoni's competitive debut came in Euro 2008 qualifying. Italy drew its first match 1–1 with Lithuania, then lost 3–1 to France. Accordingly, Italian newspaper La Naziones front page featured, "How to reduce Lippi's masterwork to pieces in just three weeks," requesting the return of Lippi. However, despite all the critics, Donadoni led Italy to five wins in a row to Georgia (3–1), Ukraine (2–0) and Scotland (2–0), the former being controversial for his omission of star Alessandro Del Piero from the squad. One of the main criticisms addressed by the media towards Donadoni was his alleged lack of pressure in persuading Francesco Totti to play again for the Azzurri. Following a question regarding a possible call-up for the Roma player, Donadoni jokingly claimed not to know him.

Italy qualified for Euro 2008 after a successful campaign, topping the group ahead of France, in spite of the shaky start. They defeated Scotland 2–1 in Glasgow to confirm their qualification.

Euro 2008 campaign
On 9 June 2008, Donadoni was handed the biggest defeat for Italy's national team in over 25 years by former Milan teammate Marco van Basten, a 3–0 loss to the Netherlands. Italy captain Fabio Cannavaro was unable to play due to injury, and Donadoni was widely criticised for his choice of players for the match. His team drew the subsequent match with Romania on 13 June, despite some controversial officiating which saw a goal called back in each of these games creating intense criticism of the officials. The team then beat France 2–0 on 17 June to progress to the quarter-finals against much-fancied Spain, the eventual champions. The two teams played out a 0–0 draw, the only match Spain was held scoreless in regular time throughout the tournament. However, the Spaniards won 4–2 on penalties.

After Italy's disappointing performance at the tournament, on 26 June 2008 Donadoni was sacked by the Italian Football Federation (FIGC), which named Lippi as his replacement.

Post-international club coaching career
Napoli
On 10 March 2009, Napoli announced it had appointed Donadoni as its new head coach following the termination of Edoardo Reja after five years leading the club. Donadoni's first match in charge was a 1–1 draw with Reggina.

After a 2–1 loss to Roma on 6 October 2009, Donadoni was terminated as Napoli manager. He was replaced by former Sampdoria coach Walter Mazzarri.

Cagliari
On 16 November 2010, it was announced Donadoni would become head coach of Serie A relegation battlers Cagliari, replacing Pierpaolo Bisoli. After joining Cagliari, the club won its next two matches, 2–1 against Brescia on 21 November and 3–2 against Lecce on 28 November.

However, on 12 August 2011, two weeks prior to the start of the 2011–12 Serie A, Donadoni was surprisingly sacked by Cagliari chairman Massimo Cellino. Italian press sources cited divergencies between Donadoni and Cellino regarding the sale of Alessandro Matri to Juventus and the affair involving David Suazo, who first joined the pre-season training camp only to be asked to leave days later.

Donadoni was in talks with Iran Pro League side Persepolis in December 2011. However, no contract was reached.

Parma
On 9 January 2012, Donadoni was unveiled as head coach of Serie A club Parma, replacing Franco Colomba. Upon arriving at the club, the situation in the league table was critical for Parma, being close to the relegation zone.

Parma's results improved immediately under Donadoni, winning seven Serie A matches in a row, a club record. Parma would finish the season in eighth place in the league table, equal on points with seventh-placed Roma.

Donadoni's initial contract ran until 2013, but this was extended by two years in October 2012, the longest deal club president Tommaso Ghirardi had made with a head coach. At the end of the 2012–13 season, Parma impressed and finished in a comfortable tenth place, despite initial fears it would be relegated. In 2014, Donadoni guided Parma to sixth place in Serie A, helping the club to qualify for the UEFA Europa League for the first time since 2007. However, their entry to the tournament was barred because of the late payment of income tax on salaries, failing to qualify for a UEFA license, for which the club would also be docked seven points during the 2014–15 Serie A season.

The following season, Parma's continuing severe financial difficulties led to the club's eventual bankruptcy in March 2015, which meant the club be relegated. Although the FIGC allowed the club to complete the league season in Serie A, they finished bottom of the league in 20th place. Donadoni, who reported that he, as well as the Parma staff and players, had not received wages since July 2014, left the club at the end of the season.

Bologna
In October 2015, Donadoni was hired by newly promoted Serie A club Bologna as the club's new coach, replacing Delio Rossi. Donadoni parted with Bologna on 24 May 2018.

Shenzhen
On 30 July 2019, Donadoni was appointed as manager of Chinese club Shenzhen.

Managerial statistics

Honours
PlayerA.C. MilanSerie A: 1987–88, 1991–92, 1992–93, 1993–94, 1995–96, 1998–99
Coppa Italia runner-up: 1989–90, 1997–98
Supercoppa Italiana: 1992, 1993, 1994
European Cup/UEFA Champions League: 1988–89, 1989–90, 1993–94
European Super Cup: 1989, 1990, 1994
Intercontinental Cup: 1989, 1990AtalantaSerie B: 1983–84
Serie C1: 1981–82Al-IttihadSaudi Premier League: 1999–2000ItalyFIFA World Cup third place: 1990
FIFA World Cup runner-up: 1994
UEFA European Championship semi-finalist: 1988
UEFA U-21 European Football Championship runner-up: 1986Individual'''
MLS All-star: 1996, 1997
MLS Best XI: 1996
Premio Nazionale Carriera Esemplare "Gaetano Scirea": 1998
Premio internazionale Giacinto Facchetti: 2015
AC Milan Hall of Fame

Orders
 5th Class / Knight: Cavaliere Ordine al Merito della Repubblica Italiana'': 1991

References

External links

Profile at FIGC.it  

Profile at Italia1910.com 

1963 births
Living people
1990 FIFA World Cup players
1994 FIFA World Cup players
A.C. Milan players
Ittihad FC players
U.S. Livorno 1915 managers
Atalanta B.C. players
Calcio Lecco 1912 managers
Expatriate soccer players in the United States
Association football wingers
Genoa C.F.C. managers
S.S.C. Napoli managers
Cagliari Calcio managers
Parma Calcio 1913 managers
Italian expatriate footballers
Italian expatriate sportspeople in the United States
Italian footballers
Italian football managers
Italian expatriate football managers
Italy international footballers
Italy national football team managers
Italy under-21 international footballers
New York Red Bulls players
Sportspeople from the Province of Bergamo
Serie A managers
Serie A players
Serie B players
UEFA Euro 1988 players
UEFA Euro 1996 players
UEFA Euro 2008 managers
Major League Soccer All-Stars
Major League Soccer players
Bologna F.C. 1909 managers
UEFA Champions League winning players
Saudi Professional League players
Expatriate football managers in China
Footballers from Lombardy
Expatriate footballers in Saudi Arabia
Italian expatriate sportspeople in Saudi Arabia
Knights of the Order of Merit of the Italian Republic